Roller sports at the 2015 Pan American Games in Toronto were held from July 11 to 13.

The speed skating competitions were held at the St. John Paul II Catholic Secondary School. Originally the 400 meters oval would be constructed at CIBC Pan Am/Parapan Am Aquatics Centre and Field House and meant to be temporary but a last minute venue change to St. John Paul II Catholic Secondary School meant that the high school got to keep the track after the competition.

The figure skating competitions took place at the Direct Energy Centre (Exhibition Centre) – Hall B. Due to naming rights the venue was known as the latter for the duration of the games. A total of eight events (six in speed and two in figure) were contested, with the events being equally split between each gender.

Competition schedule

The following is the competition schedule for the roller sports competitions:

Medal table

Medalists

Figure skating

Speed skating

Participating nations
A total of 15 nations qualified athletes. The numbers in parenthesis represents the number of participants entered.

Qualification

A total of 56 skaters qualified to compete at the Games. 20 male and 20 female speed skaters along with eight male and eight female figure skaters qualified. A nation was allowed to enter a maximum of six athletes (two male and two females in speed skating, with a maximum of one athlete per each figure skating event). The host nation (Canada) automatically qualified with a full team.

References

 
Events at the 2015 Pan American Games
Pan American Games
2015